Giampiero Anelli (born 10 August 1947), best known as Drupi, is an Italian rock singer, best known for the songs "Vado via", "Piccola e fragile", "Sereno è" and "Due".

Background 
Born in Pavia, Drupi, a former plumber whose hobby was fishing, started his career as lead singer of the band Le Calamite ("The Magnets"). Having been noticed by songwriters Luigi Albertelli and Enrico Riccardi, he entered the 1973 Sanremo Music Festival competition with the song "Vado via". The song ended in last place but achieved significant international success and launched his solo career. "Vado via", recorded on A & M Records, reached number 17 in the UK chart in January 1974 (remaining one of the very few songs not sung in English to enter the UK charts).  National popularity arrived in the same year with the song "Piccola e fragile", which topped the Italian hit parade.

Drupi has lived in Austria since 2010. A singer from a rhythm and blues background, his popularity remains linked to several pop and soft rock hits. In 1975 he won the Festivalbar with the song "Due". He has returned several times to the Sanremo Music Festival, achieving third place in 1982 with the song "Soli".  

His stage name is a reference to the Tex Avery character Droopy.

Discography

Selected singles
 1973: "Vado via" (original version)
 1973: "She (Didn't Remember My Name)"
 1974: "Piccola e fragile"
 1975: "Due"
 1975: "Sereno è..."
 1976: "Bella bellissima"
 1976: "Sambariò"
 1977: "Con fantasia"
 1977: "Come va..."
 1978: "Gentea"
 1978: "Paese"
 1978: "Provincia"
 1979: "Una come te"
 1979: "E grido e vivo e amo"
 1979: "Buona notte"
 1979: "Můj sen je touha žít" (based on Vado Via, Hana Zagorová & Drupi) 
 1980: "Setkání" / "Kam Jsi To Letět Chtěl, Ptáčku Můj" (Hana Zagorová & Drupi) 
 1980: "Sera"
 1981: "La mia canzone al vento"
 1981: "Princess of the Night" / "Stai con me"
 1982: "Soli"
 1983: "Regalami un sorriso"
 1983: "Canta"
 1984: "I Feel for You" / "Fammi volare"
 1988: "Era bella davvero"
 1992: "Un uomo in più"

Studio albums

 1974: Drupi
 1974: Sereno è...
 1975: Due
 1976: Drupi (La visiera si stacca e si indossa!)
 1977: Di solito la gente mi chiama Drupi
 1978: Provincia
 1979: E grido e vivo e amo
 1981: Drupi
 1983: Canta
 1985: Un passo
 1989: Drupi
 1990: Avanti
 1992: Amica mia
 1993: Storie d'amore
 1995: Voglio una donna
 1997: Bella e strega
 2004: Buone notizie
 2007: Fuori target
 2013: Ho sbagliato secolo

References

External links

 

 

 

1947 births
Musicians from Pavia
Living people
Italian rock singers
Italian plumbers
Italian builders
Austrian people of Italian descent
ZYX Music artists
Mint Records artists
Italian expatriates in Austria